Alfie is a given name, surname, and nickname for the given names Alfonso and Alfred. Alfie may refer to:

People

In sports 
 Alfie Almario (1963–2001), Philippine Basketball Association player
 Alfie Beestin (born 1997), English professional footballer
 Alfred "Alfie" Biggs (1936–2012), English footballer
 Alfred "Alfie" Binns (1929–2017), West Indian cricketer
 Alfred "Alfie" Burden (born 1976), English snooker player
 Alfred "Alfie" Conn Sr. (1926–2009), Scottish international footballer
 Alfred "Alfie" Conn Jr. (born 1952), Scottish international footballer, son of the above
 Alfie Cullen (1914–1998), Irish hurler
 Alfie Egan (born 1997), English footballer
 Alfie Evans (1917–1992), Australian rules footballer
 Alfie Gleadall (born 2000), English cricketer
 Alfie Haaland (born 1972), Norwegian former footballer
 Alfred "Alfie" Hale (born 1939), Irish former footballer and manager
 Alfie Hewett (born 1997), British wheelchair tennis player
 Allan Jeffrey "Alfie" Langer (born 1966), Australian rugby league player
 Justin Langer (born 1970), Australian former cricketer, known by the nickname "Alfie"
 Adam Le Fondre (born 1986), English football player, known by the nickname ALF or subsequently Alfie
 Alphonsus "Alfie" Linehar (born 1940), Irish former cricketer
 Alfie Mafi (born 1988), Australian rugby union football player
 Alfie Mawson (born 1994), English footballer
 Alfie May (born 1993), English professional footballer
 Alfie Michaud (born 1976), Canadian ice hockeyer
 Alfie Miller (born 1954), British ice hockey player
 Alfie Mocelutu (born 1971), former Fijian rugby union player
 Alfie Moore (1904–1979), professional ice hockey goaltender
 Alfie Pavey (born 1995), English footballer
 Alfie Plant (born 1995), English professional golfer
 Alfie Stokes (1932–2002), footballer
 Alfie Potter (born 1989), English footballer
 Alfred "Alfie" Shrubb (1879–1964), English middle and long-distance runner
 Gareth Thomas (rugby) (born 1974), Welsh former rugby union team captain, nicknamed "Alfie"
 Real Jean "Alfie" Turcotte (born 1965), American former National Hockey League player
 Alfred Uluinayau (born 1970), New Zealand rugby union coach and former player
 Alfie Vaeluaga (born 1981), rugby union player from Samoa

In arts and entertainment 
 Alfie Agnew (born 1969), American mathematician, singer, musician, and songwriter
 Alfie Anido (1959–1981), popular Filipino matinee idol
 Alfie Arcuri (born 1988), Australian singer-songwriter
 Alfie Allen (born 1986), English actor
 Alfie Bass (1916–1987), English actor born Abraham Basalinsky
 Alfred "Alfie" Boe (born 1973), English tenor and actor
 Alfie Browne-Sykes (born 1994), English actor
 Alfie Clarke (actor) (born 2007), English actor
 Alfie Curtis (1930–2017), actor
 Alfie Deyes (born 1993), English YouTuber, property investor, and author
 Robert Hannaford (born 1944), Australian realist artist known as Alfie
 Alfie Joey (born 1967), writer, comic, actor, impressionist, singer, presenter, and cartoonist
 Alfie Lorenzo (1939–2017), Filipino showbiz columnist, TV host, and talent manager
 Alfie Moore (comedian) (born 1966), English police officer, writer, stand-up comedian, and radio performer
 Alfie Scopp (1919-2021), Canadian actor
 Alfie Templeman (born 2003), English singer-songwriter, multi-instrumentalist and producer
 Alfie Zappacosta (born 1953), Canadian singer/songwriter

Politicians 
 Alfred "Alfie" Byrne (1882–1956), Irish politician
 Alfie Ferguson, British and unionist politician
 Alfred "Alfie" MacLeod (born 1956), Canadian politician

Other 
 Alfie Dennen, British technologist and pundit
 Alfred "Alfie" Fripp (1913–2013), Second World War Royal Air Force flight sergeant
 Alfie Kohn (born 1957), American author and lecturer
 Alfie Lambe (1932–1959), Irish-born Roman Catholic activist
 Isaac Alfie (born 1962), Uruguayan economist, former Minister of Economy and Finance

Characters 
 Alfie Moon, in the BBC soap opera EastEnders
 Alfie O'Meagan, a Marvel Comics supervillain
 Alfie Wickers, protagonist of the British TV series Bad Education
 Alfie, an excavator in Thomas & Friends
 Alfie, from "Demon Dentist" by David Walliams
 Alfie, one of the titular characters in the Alfie & Annie Rose stories by Shirley Hughes
 Alfie, a customer service assistant in Bluey
 Alfie, a love interest of the titular character in the Netflix series Emily in Paris

See also 
 Alf (name)
 Alfred (disambiguation)
 Alfie (disambiguation)

References